Norbert Brinkmann (born 16 June 1952) is a German former footballer who played as a centre-back. He played in the Bundesliga and 2. Bundesliga with Bayer Uerdingen and won the DFB-Pokal in 1985.

References

1952 births
Living people
West German footballers
Sportspeople from Oberhausen
Footballers from North Rhine-Westphalia
Association football central defenders
KFC Uerdingen 05 players
Bundesliga players
2. Bundesliga players